Michael J. Rogers (born February 20, 1964) is an American politician and a Democratic member of the Maryland House of Delegates, representing Maryland's District 32 in Anne Arundel County.

Early life and career
Rogers was born in Detroit, Michigan on February 20, 1964. He attended Hillcrest High School in Dalzell, South Carolina and graduated from New Hanover High School in Wilmington, North Carolina in 1982.

Rogers served in the U.S. Army Medical Service Corps from 1986 to 2015, serving in positions ranging from platoon leader to brigade commander and retiring at the rank of colonel. He had combat deployments in Somalia, Saudi Arabia, Kuwait, Iraq, and Afghanistan, and his service awards include the Bronze Star, Legion of Merit with Oak Leaf Cluster, and Defense Superior Service Medal. Since retiring from the Army, he has served as a member of the Military Officers Association of America board of directors from 2012 to 2018 and has coached football at the Severn Athletic Club for five seasons.

In January 2018, Rogers announced his candidacy for the Maryland House of Delegates in District 32. He won the Democratic primary, coming in third place in a field of seven candidates and receiving 18.4 percent of the vote. He received 19.9 percent of the vote in the general election.

In the legislature
Rogers was sworn into the Maryland House of Delegates on January 9, 2019. He currently serves on the Economic Matters committee, Banking, Consumer Protection & Commercial Law subcommittee, Unemployment Insurance subcommittee. He is also a member of the Legislative Black Caucus of Maryland, Maryland Veterans Caucus, and is an associate member of the Maryland Legislative Latino Caucus, and Women Legislators of Maryland. In December 2020, Rogers became the first Black person to serve as vice chair of the Anne Arundel County Delegation. He became the first Black man to chair the Delegation after he was elected to the position in November 2021.

In 2020, Rogers ran for Delegate to the 2020 Democratic National Convention. He was an uncommitted delegate and received 0.8 percent of the vote in the Democratic primary election.

Political positions

Policing
In June 2020, Rogers participated in a protest against police brutality in Severn, Maryland.

Veterans
Rogers introduced legislation in the 2020 legislative session that clarified the eligibility for veterans seeking to reside at homes supervised by the Department of Veterans Affairs. The bill passed and became law on May 8, 2020.

Electoral history

References 

African-American state legislators in Maryland
Living people
Democratic Party members of the Maryland House of Delegates
Military personnel from Maryland
United States Army colonels
Politicians from Detroit
People from Anne Arundel County, Maryland
21st-century American politicians
1964 births
21st-century African-American politicians
20th-century African-American people